Gerberga (1045/65–1115), also spelled Gerberge or Gerburge, was the Countess of Provence for more than a decade, until  1112. Provence is a region located in the southeastern part of modern-day France that did not become part of France until 1481 (well after Gerberga's time).

Countess Gerberga was a daughter of Geoffrey I of Provence and his wife Etiennette. However, Gerberga did not succeed him immediately, but rather became countess decades after his death, during which time other relatives filled that position.  It is unclear exactly when she became countess; sources indicate it was no earlier than 1093 and no later than 1100.

She and her husband, Gilbert I of Gévaudan, were considered virtuous. He participated in the Crusades, donating many relics from the Middle East to churches in Provence. Gilbert later died in 1108.  Gerberga then took control of the government, and is said to have ruled wisely. In 1112, her eldest daughter Douce was married to Raymond Berengar III of Barcelona at which point Provence was ceded to him. Her second daughter, Stephanie, would lay claim to the county and thus precipitate the Baussenque Wars in 1144.

References

Sources

1060s births
1115 deaths
Counts of Provence
Provence, Countess of, Gerberga
11th-century women rulers
12th-century women rulers
11th-century French people
11th-century French women
12th-century French people
12th-century French women